Mexico City International Airport; officially Aeropuerto Internacional Benito Juárez (Benito Juárez International Airport)  is the main international airport serving Greater Mexico City, along with Toluca International Airport and, since 2022, Felipe Ángeles International Airport ("AIFA"). It is Mexico's and Latin America's busiest airport by passenger traffic and aircraft movements, and the 16th busiest in the world. The airport sustains 35,000 jobs directly and around 15,000 indirectly in the immediate area. The airport is owned by Grupo Aeroportuario de la Ciudad de México and operated by Aeropuertos y Servicios Auxiliares, the government-owned corporation, which also operates 22 other airports throughout Mexico.

This airport is served by 30 domestic and international passenger airlines and 17 cargo carriers. As the main hub for Mexico's largest airline Aeroméxico (with Aeroméxico Connect), the airport has become a SkyTeam hub. It is also a hub for Volaris and a focus city for VivaAerobús. On a typical day, more than 136,000 passengers pass through the airport to and from more than 100 destinations on four continents. In 2020, the airport handled 21,981,711 passengers, and 36,056,614 in 2021.

Location 
As the airport is located on the east side of Mexico City and its runways run southwest–northeast, an airliner's landing approach is usually directly over the conurbation of Mexico City when the wind is from the northeast. Therefore, there is an important overflying problem and noise pollution.

History

Origins 

The original site, known as Llanos de Balbuena, had been used for aeronautical activities since 1910, when Alberto Braniff became the first to fly an aeroplane in Mexico, and in Latin America. The flight was onboard of a Voisin biplane. On November 30, 1911, President Francisco I. Madero, was the first head of State in the world to fly onboard of a Deperdussin airplane piloted by Geo M. Dyott of Moisant International.
In 1915 the airport first opened as Balbuena Military Airport with five runways. Construction of a small civilian airport began in 1928. The first landing was on November 5, 1928, and regular service started in 1929, but was officially inaugurated on May 15, 1931. On July 8, 1943, the Official Gazette of the Federation published a decree that acknowledged Mexico City's Central Airport as an international airport, capable of managing international arrivals and departures of passengers and aircraft. Its first international route was to Los Angeles International Airport operated by Mexicana. Construction of Runway 05D-23I started six years later, as well as new facilities such as a platform, a terminal building, a control tower and offices for the authorities. The runway started its operations in 1951. On November 19, 1952, President Miguel Alemán opened the passenger terminal, which later became Terminal 1.

In 1956 the airport had four runways in service: 05L-23R (2,720 m long, 40 m wide), 05R-23L (3,000 m long, 45 m wide), with electric lights for night-time service; 13-31 (2,300m long, 40m wide) which had been built to relieve 14-32, to which residential areas had encroached too closely; and 5 Auxiliar (759m long).

1960s–1990s 

On December 2, 1963, Walter C. Buchanan, former director of the Transport and Communications Department (SCT), changed the airport's name "Aeropuerto Central" (Central Airport) to "Aeropuerto Internacional de la Ciudad de México" (Mexico City International Airport).

In the 1970s, president Luis Echeverría closed the two remaining shorter runways (13/31 and 5 Auxiliar); on the land of 13-31 a social housing complex was built, Unidad Fiviport. leaving the two parallel runways. In 1980, the terminal was expanded to double its capacity, using a single large terminal rather than multiple terminals as in other airports. Ten years later in 1990, the mixed domestic/international gates were separated to increase the terminal's functionality, along with the separation of domestic and international check-in halls. 

On November 24, 1978, the "Mexico" Control Tower began its operations; it has been in service since then.

The AICM has continually improved its infrastructure. On August 15, 1979, and after about a year of remodeling works, the terminal building reopened to the public; the airport continued its operations during the renovation, which improved passenger transit with better space distribution in walkways and rooms.

Due to constant growth in demand of both passengers and operations, on January 13, 1994, the Official Gazette of the Federation, published a presidential decree that prohibited general aviation operations in the AICM, which were moved to Toluca International Airport in order to clear air traffic in the capital's airport.

Renovations to the AICM continued and on April 11, 1994, a new International Terminal building was ready and operational. It was built by a private contractor according to a co-investment agreement with Airports and Auxiliary Services. In 2001, in order to further improve service to passengers, construction for Module XI started. This Module permitted eight new contact positions in the Airport Terminal, capable of receiving eight regular airplanes, two wide-body, or four narrow-body aircraft.

2003–2007 expansion 
Instead, to respond to the growing demand and aiming to position the AICM as one of the greatest in terms of quality, services, security, and operational functionality, on May 30, 2003, the Federal Government announced an update: an extension to the air terminal in order to widen its service capacity from 20 million to 32 million passengers a year. This program was part of the Metropolitan Airport System, promoted by the Federal Administration. The renovations include new airline counters, commercial spaces and an elevator for people with disabilities, which improved the flow of passengers with domestic destinations.

Among other works performed in the international area, a long-distance bus terminal was built with connections to Puebla, Cuernavaca, Pachuca, Toluca, Querétaro and Orizaba. The new bus station has access to a food court and the international arrivals and departures area, as well as a pedestrian bridge that connects to "The Peñón de los Baños" neighbourhood.

The airport was formally named after the 19th-century president Benito Juárez in 2006.

On November 15, 2007, Terminal 2 was opened, significantly increasing the airport's capacity. All SkyTeam members moved their operations to the new terminal, except Air France and KLM. It was officially inaugurated in March 2008, once the new road accesses and taxiways were finished. Terminal 2 increased the airport's contact positions by 40% and the operational capacity by 15%. The terminal was inaugurated by former President Felipe Calderón Hinojosa.

Lack of capacity and slot restrictions 

The airport has suffered from a lack of capacity due to restrictions on expansion, since it is located in a densely populated area. In 2014, Mexican authorities declared the air space around the airport saturated from 7:00 to 23:59 and established a maximum capacity of 61 operations per hour. A declaration of saturation of the airport itself, from 5:00 to 23:59 for Terminal 1 and from 6:00 to 23:00 for Terminal 2, was issued in 2022, with the same operations limit (61/h).

Another issue with the airport is the limitation that its two parallel runways provide (as they are not separated far away enough for fully independent operation). For this reason, only government, military, commercial and specially authorized aircraft are allowed to use the airport. Private aircraft must use alternate airports, such as Lic. Adolfo López Mateos International Airport in Toluca, General Mariano Matamoros Airport in Cuernavaca, or Hermanos Serdán International Airport in Puebla.

Attempt to replace the airport 

Construction of a new Mexico City international airport was announced by Mexican president Enrique Peña Nieto on September 2, 2014, who said that it would be "emblemático": a national symbol, replacing the current Mexico City International Airport, which is at capacity. The architects were Sir Norman Foster and Fernando Romero, son-in-law of billionaire Carlos Slim and architect of the Soumaya Museum.

Construction was to take eight years, costing 120 or 169 billion Mexican pesos, about 9–13 billion U.S. dollars, depending on the source, on land already owned by the federal government in the Zona Federal del Lago de Texcoco, between Ecatepec and Atenco in the State of Mexico, about 10 km northeast of the current airport.    The terminal was to be sustainable, aiming at a LEED Platinum certification.    The project was cancelled on October 30, 2018 following a referendum. The costs of cancellation are estimated at over  billion.

Terminals and facilities

Terminals 
Mexico City International Airport has two passenger terminals. Terminal 1 is separated from Terminal 2 by the runways.

Terminal 1 
 Opened in 1958; expanded in 1970, 1989, 1998, 2000 and 2004
 Overall terminal surface: 
 Contact positions: 33
 Two contact positions equipped for the Airbus A380
 Remote positions: 17 (34 Before New T2 was built)
 Number of jetways: 33
 Number of airside halls: 10
 Number of landside (check-in) halls: 9 
 Number of mobile-lounges: 11 
 Hotel service:
 600 room Camino Real
 288 room Courtyard by Marriott
 327 room Fiesta Inn (Located across from Terminal 1)
 110 room Hilton
 Parking service: 3,100 vehicles (Domestic), 2,400 vehicles (International)
 Space per passenger in T1: 
 Number of baggage claim carousels: 22

Terminal 2 
 Opened in 2007
 Overall terminal surface: 
 Contact positions: 30
 Remote positions: 10
 Number of jetways: 30
 Number of airside halls: 2 (Domestic, International)
 Number of landside (check-in) halls: 3 (L1, L2, L3)
 Hotel service:
 287 room NH
 Parking service: 3,000 vehicles
 Space per passenger in T2: 
 Number of baggage claim carousels: 15)
 Platform surface: 
 Inter-terminal Aerotrén capacity: 7,800 daily passengers

The new facility will help AICM increase its capacity to 32 million passengers per year.

Air operations in the new facilities began on November 15, 2007, with flights by Delta Air Lines, and later AeroMéxico, Copa, LAN and Continental Airlines. Terminal 2 was formally inaugurated by former Presidente Felipe Calderón Hinojosa on March 26, 2008.

These projects were done without affecting airplane takeoffs and landings, and will help Mexico City International Airport offer better services, and respond to the growing demand of passengers and operations in the coming years.

Although the terminal was intended to be served by all SkyTeam member airlines, Air France and KLM decided to remain at Terminal 1. Terminal 2 now houses most Aeroméxico flights out of the airport, becoming the airline's main distribution centre. Due to Terminal 2 capacity constraints, Aeromexico service to certain domestic destinations returned to Terminal 1 on December 11, 2021.

Terminal 3 (proposed) 
The proposed construction of a Terminal 3 was canceled during the 2020 global COVID-19 pandemic. It is estimated that it will take several years to bring the number of flights back to 2019 levels. The General Felipe Ángeles International Airport in Santa Lucía, Mexico State opened in 2022, which may make it harder for AICM to reach those levels.

Other facilities 
Aeropuertos y Servicios Auxiliares, a government-owned corporation that operates airports in Mexico, has its headquarters on the airport property, Aeropuertos y Servicios Auxiliares. The Aeromar headquarters are located in Hangar 7 in Zone D of the General Aviation Terminal of the airport. Aviacsa used to have its headquarters in Hangar 1 in Zone C, but it ceased operations on May 4, 2011.

The Base Aérea Militar número 19 (Military Air Base number 19), formerly Sexto Grupo Aéreo de la Fuerza Aérea Mexicana (Sixth Air Group of the Mexican Air Force), opened at the AICM on July 22, 2020, when the presidential airplane " José María Morelos y Pavón" (XC-MEX) returned from the United States, where it had been put up for sale. The main hangar on the base is being used to store supplies for the COVID-19 pandemic in Mexico.

Airlines and destinations 
The airport connects 50 domestic and 64 international destinations in Latin America, North America, Europe and Asia. Aeromexico serves the largest number of cities from any Latin American hub (80), 46 domestic and 34 international. Most prominent foreign airlines are United Airlines, American Airlines, Delta Air Lines and Avianca Holdings. Aeroméxico/Aeroméxico Connect operates the most departures from the airport followed by Volaris. Aeroméxico also operates to the most destinations.

Passenger 

Notes
 Turkish Airlines' flight from Mexico City to Istanbul makes a stop in Cancún; however, the airline does not have local traffic rights between Mexico City and Cancún.

Other services 
In addition to the scheduled airlines above, Mexico City airport is used by some further airlines for chartered flights including:

 Sunwing Airlines

Cargo 

As of January 2022, Mexico City airport was served by 20 cargo airlines flying directly to Europe, Central, North and South America, Middle East, Africa and East Asia. The following airlines operate the scheduled destinations below.

Airlines providing on-demand cargo services

 Aeronaves TSM
 Air Cargo Carriers
 Air Transport International
 Ameristar Air Cargo
 Atlas Air operated by Panalpina
 IFL Group
 Kalitta Air
 LATAM Cargo Chile
 Líneas Aéreas Suramericanas
 USA Jet Airlines
 Vigo Jet

Traffic statistics 
In 2021, Mexico City International Airport moved 36,056,614 passengers, making it the busiest airport in Latin America in terms of total passengers. It registered a year-to-year increase of 64.0%.

In terms of international passengers, it is the second busiest airport in Latin America with 10,172,889 passengers after Cancún Airport.

In 2020, the airport was the busiest in Latin America by aircraft movements with 24% more operations than Bogotá-El Dorado and 44.65% more than São Paulo-Guarulhos. It is the 17th busiest airport in the world in terms of aircraft movements, climbing 4 spots compared to previous year. In 2020, the airport handled 215,144 aircraft operations, an average of 589 operations per day.

Regarding cargo, the airport is also the busiest in the country and the second busiest in Latin America, after El Dorado International Airport in Bogotá. It is also the 50th busiest in the world. During 2021, it moved 567,779.1 tons, an annual increase of 18.40%.

Busiest routes

Inter-terminal transportation 

Terminal 1 is connected to Terminal 2 by the Aerotrén monorail system in which only connecting passengers with hand baggage are allowed to use with their boarding pass. Technical and cabin crew can also use it. Also, there is a land service between terminals called "inter-terminal transportation". These buses are located at entrance no. 6 of Terminal 1 and entrance no. 4 of Terminal 2.

Ground transportation

Metro and bus services 
Terminal 1 is served by the Terminal Aérea Metro station, which belongs to Line 5 of the subway, running from Pantitlán station to Politécnico station. It is located just outside the national terminal. Terminal 2 does not have any metro station near, but is a  walk from Pantitlán, served by Metro lines 1, 5, 9, A, and numerous local buses.

Terminals 1 and 2 have two land terminals operating 24 hours a day, 365 days a year. Different bus lines operate from here, and provide continuous transportation services to the main cities located around Mexico City, such as Córdoba, Cuernavaca, Pachuca, Puebla, Querétaro, Tlaxcala and Toluca.

Metrobús 

In late 2010, former Head of Government of the Federal District Marcelo Ebrard announced a plan to build a new Metrobús Line 4 that would run from near Buenavista railway station in the west of the city towards Mexico City airport. Construction on Line 4 started on July 4, 2011. The plans for Line 4 included a two-step construction process with the first  operational segment to be built between Colonia Buenavista and San Lázaro station. An extension provides travel between San Lázaro and the airport. The line opened on April 1, 2012 with two stations, Terminal 1 and Terminal 2.

Authorized taxis 
Taxis are in operation in Terminals 1 and 2 and there are two models of service: Ordinary service in a sedan type vehicle for 4 passengers. Executive service in 8 passenger vans. There are 5 taxi groups in operation. These are the only taxis authorized by the Ministry of Communications and Transport (SCT) of the Federal Government.

Accidents and incidents 
 On September 26, 1949, a Mexicana de Aviacion DC-3 crashed into the Popocatepetl volcano while approaching the airport with clouds and turbulence en route from Tapachula; all 23 on board, including actress Blanca Estela Pavon, lost their lives.
 On April 10, 1968, an Aerovías Rojas Douglas R4D-3 crashed on approach, killing all eighteen people on board. The aircraft was operating a domestic scheduled passenger flight, which was the airline's inaugural flight from Aguascalientes International Airport to Mexico City.
 On October 31, 1979, Western Airlines Flight 2605 crash-landed. The crew of the DC-10 landed on a closed runway and hit construction vehicles on the runway. There were 73 fatalities (including one on the ground) and 16 survivors.
 On December 12, 1981, a bomb exploded inside the passenger cabin of a parked Aeronica Boeing 727-100, tearing a hole into the fuselage. The captain, two flight attendants, and a groundworker were injured. They had been on board the aircraft for pre-departure checks for a scheduled passenger flight to San Salvador and onwards to Managua's Augusto C. Sandino International Airport.
 An Aero California DC-9-15 overran a runway on July 21, 2004, during an intense storm at the airport. There were no victims, but the aircraft was scrapped. However, a woman died later due to a heart attack.
 On November 4, 2008, a Mexican Interior Ministry LearJet 45 crashed on approach around 18:45 local time. On board were Mexican Secretary of the Interior Juan Camilo Mouriño, who was a top aide to President Felipe Calderón. Mouriño was in charge of the fight against the drug trade in Mexico. Also on board was José Luis Santiago Vasconcelos, former assistant attorney general and current head of the federal technical secretariat for implementing the recent constitutional reforms on criminal justice and public security. All eight on board perished along with eight others on the ground. 40 others on the ground were injured. The crash was attributed to pilot error.
 On September 9, 2009, hijacked Aeroméxico Flight 576 landed at Mexico City International Airport from Cancún International Airport.
 On September 13, 2009, a Lufthansa Cargo McDonnell-Douglas MD-11 was damaged in a heavy landing. Post landing inspection revealed that there were wrinkles in the fuselage skin and the nose gear was bent. According to a Lufthansa spokesman, the aircraft would be repaired and returned into full service.

See also 
 Felipe Ángeles International Airport, another airport serving Greater Mexico City, which opened in March 2022
 Greater Mexico City#Air
 Transportation in Mexico
 Transport in Mexico City

References

External links 

 Mexico City International Airport
 Aeropuertos y Servicios Auxiliares 
 Information about Mexico City Airport
 

 
WAAS reference stations
Transportation in Mexico City
Airports in Mexico
Airports established in 1929
1929 establishments in Mexico
Benito Juárez
Buildings and structures in Mexico City
Venustiano Carranza, Mexico City